Appiah is a surname. It is the fifth common surname in Ghana. Notable people with the surname include:

Abena Appiah (born 1993), Ghanaian–American singer, model and beauty queen
Dennis Appiah (born 1992), French footballer
Dorcas Coker-Appiah (born 1946), Ghanaian lawyer and women's rights activist
Ernest Appiah Nuamah (born 2003), Ghanaian footballer
Keenan Appiah-Forson (born 2001), British footballer
Jackie Aygemang (born 1983), Ghanaian actress, known as Jackie Appiah
James Kwesi Appiah (born 1960), Ghanaian footballer and manager
Joe Appiah (1918–1990), Ghanaian lawyer and politician
John Kwasi Appiah, Ghanaian politician; member of parliament during the first republic
Kwabena Appiah (born 1992), New Zealand footballer
Kwame Anthony Appiah (born 1954), Ghanaian–British–American philosopher, son of Joe
Kwesi Appiah (born 1990), English footballer
Lily Appiah, Ghanaian politician; member of parliament during the first republic
Ofosu Appiah (born 1989), Ghanaian footballer
Peggy Appiah (1921–2006), British writer
Peter Kodwo Appiah Turkson (born 1948), Ghanaian Catholic cardinal, and president of the Pontifical Council for Justice and Peace
Stephen Appiah (born 1980), Ghanaian footballer
Simon Appiah Asamoah (born 2002), Ghanaian footballer
As a given name, Appiah means "King, Prince and a Fearless leader or Warrior"
in Ashanti language

References

Surnames of Akan origin